Tajiat Olympic Stadium (Arabic: ملعب تاجيات الاولمبي), is a football stadium that is currently under construction in Tajiat, just north of Baghdad in Iraq. It will be part of a sports complex and will hold 60,000 seats.

Plans 
First plans were drawn up in 2009, where an Olympic stadium would be built containing 100,000 seats. However, the Ministry of Youth and Sports decided to reduce the capacity to 60,000 and instead build 2 other 30,000 seater stadiums. (Ammo Baba Stadium and Al-Madina Stadium). Iranian company Boland Payeh won the design competition with their concept of the new stadium. Construction finally started in 2013, however by 2022, the stadium is still not completed, with the head of Ministry of Youth and Sports and Iraqi Football Association president Adnan Dirjal saying that the stadium construction is on hold as they are waiting for more money to complete it as it requires a lot of money.

Design 
The complex is made up of a 60,000 seat oval stadium which includes an athletics track. The complex also includes both a 2,000 and 3,500 seat training ground, and features a 4-star hotel with 70 rooms. The complex covers an area of 76,000 square metres; the stadium is surrounded by green space and water space.

The stadium is round and its facade is inspired by Arabic architecture, with the general design influenced by historical islamic buildings.

See also 

 Football in Iraq
 List of football stadiums in Iraq
 List of future stadiums

References 

Sports venues in Iraq